Andrei Yurievich Zyuzin (born January 21, 1978) is a Russian former professional ice hockey defenceman. He played in the National Hockey League (NHL) for the San Jose Sharks, Tampa Bay Lightning, New Jersey Devils, Minnesota Wild, Calgary Flames and Chicago Blackhawks.

Playing career
As a youth, Zyuzin played in the 1992 Quebec International Pee-Wee Hockey Tournament with the Druzhba-78 squad, a team from Kharkiv. Ukraine. He was trained by Ukrainian coach Ivan Pravilov, who was arrested in 2012 for sexual abuse of a teenage student, and committed suicide by hanging in prison.

Zyuzin was drafted 2nd overall by the San Jose Sharks in the 1996 NHL Entry Draft. Zyuzin has played 415 career NHL games, scoring 35 goals and 74 assists for 109 points. He was signed as an unrestricted free agent by the Calgary Flames on July 1, 2006. On February 4, 2007, in the Calgary Flames skill competition he had the hardest shot at 99.3 mph. Zyuzin scored one of the biggest goals in the history of the San Jose Sharks when he took a slapshot from the point to beat Ed Belfour and helped the Sharks take Game 4 in the 1997–1998 Western Conference quarterfinals against the Dallas Stars. Zyuzin scored the goal 6:31 into the overtime period and led the Sharks to a 1–0 win.

On June 22, 2007, Andrei Zyuzin was traded to the Chicago Blackhawks along with Steve Marr for defenceman Adrian Aucoin and the Blackhawks' seventh round pick in the 2007 NHL Entry Draft. After playing 32 games for the Blackhawks, Zyuzin left the NHL, signing with St. Petersburg SKA of the Kontinental Hockey League.

Zyuzin played parts of three seasons for St. Petersburg, achieving 31 points with the team. After leaving St. Petersburg SKA and the KHL, he headed over to Austria and Switzerland, playing parts of the 2011-12 season in the Swiss National League A for EHC Biel and playing in the Austrian Hockey League for Klagenfurt AC.

After ending his tenure in Austria and Switzerland, Zyuzin played the next two seasons with three different teams. He played 2 games in the 2012-13 VHL season for Rubin Tyumen and in the 2013-14 hockey season he played games for Bilyi Bars of the Ukrainian Hockey Championship and 8 games for HK Vitebsk of the Belarusian Extraliga, going pointless with 12 penalty minutes.

Coaching
Zyuzin began his coaching career in the 2015–16 KHL season as an assistant coach for Ufa Salavat Yulayev. The team placed fourth in the Eastern Conference and advanced to the Gagarin Cup playoffs. The team was eliminated in the Conference Finals by Metallurg Magnitogorsk in 5 games. Zyuzin returned for the 2016-17 season, once again as an assistant coach for Ufa Salavat Yulayev, finishing sixth in the Eastern Conference with 88 points. The team was eliminated in the first round of the playoffs by AK Bars Kazan.

Personal life
Andrei Zyuzin is married to his wife, Teresa, and has a son, Ivan, and a daughter, Ava.

Career statistics

Regular season and playoffs

International

References

External links 
 
 Player profile 

1978 births
Albany River Rats players
Atlant Moscow Oblast players
EHC Biel players
Bilyi Bars Bila Tserkva players
Calgary Flames players
Chicago Blackhawks players
Detroit Vipers players
HC Almaty players
EC KAC players
Kentucky Thoroughblades players
Living people
Minnesota Wild players
National Hockey League first-round draft picks
New Jersey Devils players
Rubin Tyumen players
Russian ice hockey defencemen
Salavat Yulaev Ufa players
San Jose Sharks draft picks
San Jose Sharks players
Severstal Cherepovets players
SKA Saint Petersburg players
Sportspeople from Ufa
Tampa Bay Lightning players
HK Vitebsk players